ASOIF may refer to:

 Association of Summer Olympic International Federations, a non-profit association affiliated with the International Olympic Committee.
 A Song of Ice and Fire, an ongoing series of epic fantasy novels written by George R. R. Martin